Twain may refer to:

People
 Mark Twain, pen name of American writer Samuel Langhorne Clemens (1835–1910)
 Norman Twain (1930–2016), American film producer
 Shania Twain (born 1965), Canadian singer-songwriter

Places
 Twain, California, a census-designated place in Plumas County
 Douglas River, formerly named Twain, in New Zealand

Other uses
 TWAIN, a communication standard for computer software and digital imaging devices